The Poet Laureate of Alabama is the poet laureate for the U.S. state of Alabama. The position was established in 1931 by an act of the Alabama Legislature.  Poets Laureate, who must have been Alabama residents for at least 15 years, are chosen by the governor, and serve 4-year terms.

List of Poets Laureate 
 Samuel Minturn Peck (June 12, 1930–1938)
 Mary B. Ward (1954–1958) 
 Elbert Calvin Henderson (1959–1974) 
 William Young Elliott (1975–1982) 
 Carl Patrick Morton (1983–1987) 
 Morton Dennison Prouty, Jr. (1988–1991) 
 Ralph Hammond (1992–1995)
 Helen Friedman Blackshear (1995–1999) 
 Helen Norris (1999–2003)
 Sue Walker (2003–2013 )
 Andrew Glaze (2013-2017)
 Jennifer Horne (2017-2021)
 Ashley M. Jones (2021-2025)

See also

 List of U.S. states' Poets Laureate
 United States Poet Laureate
 Poet laureate

Notes

External links
Poets Laureate of Alabama at the Encyclopedia of Alabama
Poets Laureate of Alabama at the Library of Congress

 
Alabama culture
American Poets Laureate